Paul Thek (November 2, 1933 – August 10, 1988) was an American painter, sculptor and installation artist. Thek was active in both the United States and Europe, exhibiting several installations and sculptural works over the course of his life. Posthumously, he has been widely exhibited throughout the United States and Europe, and his work is held in numerous collections including the Hirshhorn Museum and Sculpture Garden in Washington, DC, the Centre Georges Pompidou, Paris, and Kolumba, the Art Museum of the Archdiocese of Cologne.

Life and career 
Thek (born George Thek) was the second of four children born to parents of German and Irish ancestry in Brooklyn. In 1950, Thek studied at the Art Students League of New York as well as Pratt Institute in Brooklyn, before entering Cooper Union School of the Arts in New York in 1951. Upon graduating in 1954, he moved to Miami, where he met and became involved with set designer Peter Harvey, who introduced Thek to a number of artists and writers such as Tennessee Williams. During this time, Thek created some of his first known drawings, including studies in charcoal and graphite (now held in Kolumba's collections), later followed by abstract watercolors and oil paintings. Thek first referred to himself as Paul Thek starting in 1955; in a letter to Harvey, he writes: "Let me tell you who I am George Joseph Thek but Paul to you and Paul to me you would have to be me to know why I am Paul after all this erroneous George business." In 1957, he exhibited his works for the first time at Mirrell Gallery in Miami. It was in Florida that Thek first met photographer Peter Hujar, who photographed Thek in Coral Gables.

By the end of 1959, Thek and Hujar, now a couple, were living in New York. Thek traveled to Italy in 1962, and with Hujar visited the Catacombs of the Capuchins in Palermo, an experience which had a strong influence on his work.

During the 1960s, Thek and Hujar associated with a number of artists and writers including Joseph Raffaele, Eva Hesse, Gene Swenson, and Susan Sontag. Thek was particularly close to Sontag, who dedicated her 1966 collection of essays, Against Interpretation, to him. According to Sontag's biographer, the title and inspiration for the eponymous essay came from Thek. One day when Sontag was "talking about art in a cerebral way that many complained was a bore," he interrupted: "Susan, stop, stop. I'm against interpretation. We don't look at art when we interpret it. That's not the way to look at art."

In 1964, he participated in Andy Warhol's Screen Tests. It was during this time that he began to work in installation and sculpture, most notably creating wax sculptures made in the likeness of meat. Between 1964–67, Thek had three solo exhibitions of his famed Technological Reliquaries at Stable Gallery and Pace Gallery in New York.

Thek was awarded a Fulbright fellowship in 1967 to Italy, leaving New York shortly after his exhibition for The Tomb opened. The figure in Thek's Tomb was popularly associated with the American hippie movement and has often been mistitled as Death of a Hippie. He traveled and lived throughout Europe during the late 1960s and early 1970s and worked on large scale installations.

After a peripatetic lifestyle, Thek took up permanent residence in New York in 1976 and began teaching at Cooper Union.  Amid increasing emotional stress, he struggled to make and sell work, but began to show nationally and internationally again during the 1980s. He died on August 10, 1988 after learning he had AIDS the year prior. After his death, Sontag dedicated AIDS and Its Metaphors to his memory.

In 2010, the Whitney Museum of American Art exhibited the first American retrospective of Thek's work with Diver, a Retrospective. Works of Paul Thek are on permanent display at The Watermill Center on Long Island, New York.

Notable works

Technological Reliquaries, or Meat Pieces (1964–67) is among Thek's most notable body of works, wax sculptures made in the likeness of raw meat and human limbs encased in Plexiglas vitrines. In a 1966 interview, he speaks of the work: “I hope the work has the innocence of those Baroque Crypts in Sicily; their initial effect is so stunning you fall back for a moment and then it's exhilarating…It delighted me that bodies could be used to decorate a room, like flowers. We accept our thing-ness intellectually but the emotional acceptance of it can be a joy.”

The Tomb (1967), perhaps his most famous work, was a pink ziggurat which encased an effigy of Thek made from a mannequin with face, hands, and feet cast from his own body. Painted in a light pink, the effigy featured a protruding tongue and a hand bloodied from amputation, and was surrounded by other casts of Thek's body in cases roped off with red cords in reference to archeological digs.

The Procession/The Artist's Co-op (1969, Stedelijk Museum, Amsterdam), Pyramid/A Work in Progress (1971–72, Moderna Museet, Stockholm), Ark, Pyramid (1972, documenta 5, Kassel), and Ark, Pyramid, Easter (1973, Kunstmuseum Luzern) were a series of conceptually-related installations created with a number of collaborators during Thek's time in Europe. Each contained common elements which served to create an immersive environment, including: the “Hippie” (a cast of Thek's body), the Dwarf Parade Table (a table supported by a latex statue of a dwarf and chairs), and a chicken coop. With each installation came an increasing number of items compromising the pieces, to the point at which much of Ark, Pyramid, Easter had to be destroyed as Kunstmuseum Luzern could no longer store the components.

Selected exhibitions

Selected solo exhibitions 
 2022: Paul Thek: Italian Hours, Fondazione Nicola del Roscio, Rome, Italy
 2021: Paul Thek: Relativity Clock, Alexander and Bonin, New York
 2021: Paul Thek: Interior/Landscape, The Watermill Center, Water Mill, New York
 2015: Ponza and Roma, Alexander and Bonin, New York; Mai 36 Galerie, Zürich
 2015: Please Write! Paul Thek and Franz Deckwitz: An Artists' Friendship, Museum Boijmans Van Beuningen, Rotterdam
 2013: Nothing But Time: Paul Thek Revisited 1964–1987, Pace Gallery, London
 2012–13: Paul Thek, in Process, Moderna Museet, Stockholm; Lehmbruck Museum, Duisburg; Kunstmuseum Luzern
 2012–13: Art is Liturgy – Paul Thek and the Others, Kolumba, Art Museum of The Archdiocese of Cologne
 2010–11: Paul Thek: Diver, A Retrospective, Whitney Museum of American Art, New York; Carnegie Museum of Art, Pittsburgh; Hammer Museum, Los Angeles
 2009: Paul Thek: Artist's Artist, Museo Nacional Centro de Arte Reina Sofia, Madrid
 2005: Paul Thek Luzern 1973/2005, Kunstmuseum Luzern
 1995: Paul Thek: The wonderful world that almost was, Witte de With Center for Contemporary Art, Rotterdam; Neue Nationalgalerie, Berlin; Fundacio Antoni Tapies, Barcelona; Kunsthalle Zürich/Museum für Gegenwartskunst, Zürich; MAC, galeries contemporaines des musées de Marseille, Marseille
 1991: Paul Thek, Newspaper and Notebook Drawings, Brooke Alexander Gallery New York
 1977: Paul Thek/Processions, Institute of Contemporary Art, Philadelphia
 1976: The Personal Effects of the Pied Piper, Galerie Alexandre Iolas
 1973: Ark, Pyramid-Easter, Kunstmuseum Luzern
 1972: A Station of the Cross, Galerie M.E. Thelen, Essen
 1971: Pyramid/A Work in Progress, Moderna Museet, Stockholm
 1969: The Procession/The Artist's Co-op, Stedelijk Museum, Amsterdam
 1968: A Procession in Honor of Aesthetic Progress: Objects Theoretically to Wear, Carry, Pull or Wave, Galerie M.E. Thelen, Essen
 1967: The Tomb, Stable Gallery, New York
 1966: Paul Thek: Recent Work, Pace Gallery, New York

Selected group exhibitions 

 2018: Like Life: Sculpture, Color, and the Body, Met Breuer, New York
 2013: Paul Thek and his Circle in the 1950s''', Leslie-Lohman Museum of Gay and Lesbian Art, New York
 2007–08: Paul Thek. Works in the Context of Contemporary Art, ZKM Center for Art and Media, Karlsruhe; Sammlung Falckenberg, Hamburg
 2003: Global Village: The 1960s, Montreal Museum of Fine Arts
 2001: Painting at the Edge of the World, Walker Art Center, Minneapolis
 1999: Circa 1968, Serralves Museum of Contemporary Art, Porto
 1984: Content: A Contemporary Focus 1974–1984, Hirshhorn Museum and Sculpture Garden, Washington, DC
 1981: Drawing Distinctions, American Drawings of the Seventies, Louisiana Museum of Modern Art, Denmark; Kunsthalle Basel; Stadtische Galerie im Lenbachhaus; Wilhelm-Hack-Museum, Ludwigshafen
 1976: La Biennale di Venezia
 1973: documenta 5, Kassel
 1971: Depth and Presence, The Cocoran Gallery of Art, Washington, DC
 1969: Human Concern/Personal Torment-The Grotesque in American Art, Whitney Museum of American Art, New York
 1968: documenta 4, Kassel

 Selected collections 
 Kunstmuseum, Bern
 Erzbischoefliches Diözesanmuseum, Cologne
 Ludwig Museum, Cologne
 Des Moines Art Center, IA
 Johnssen Collection, Essen
 Museum Folkwang, Essen
 Weatherspoon Art Gallery, Greensboro, NC
 Greenville County Museum of Art, SC
 Los Angeles County Museum of Art
 Kunstmuseum, Luzern
 Walker Art Center, Minneapolis
 Newark Museum, NJ
 Museum of Modern Art, New York
 Whitney Museum of American Art, New York
 Carnegie Museum of Art, Pittsburgh
 Centre George Pompidou, Paris
 Philadelphia Museum of Art
 Museum Boijmans Van Beuningen, Rotterdam
 Hirshhorn Museum & Sculpture Garden, Washington, DC
 Federation of Migros, Zürich
 Serralves Museum of Contemporary Art, Porto

Selected bibliography
 Paul Thek. From Cross to Crib. Cologne: Walther Koenig, 2014 
 Neubauer, Susanne. Paul Thek in Process. Commentaries on/of an exhibition. Berlin: Revolver Publishing, 2014 
 Schachter, Kenny. Nothing But Time: Paul Thek Revisited 1964 – 1987. ex cat. London: Pace, 2013. 
 Sussman, Elisabeth and Lynn Zelevansky. Paul Thek: Diver. ex cat, New York: Whitney Museum of American Art; Pittsburgh: Carnegie Museum of Art; New Haven: Yale University Press, 2011 
 Falckenberg, Harald and Peter Weibel, eds. Paul Thek: Artist's Artist. Cambridge, MA: The MIT Press; Karlsruhe: ZKM | Center for Art and Media Technology, 2008 
 Brehm, Margrit, and Axel Heil, Roberto Ohrt, eds. Tales the Tortoise Taught Us.. König, Cologne 2008, 
 Wittmann, Philipp. Paul Thek – Vom Frühwerk zu den "Technologischen Reliquiaren". Friedland: Klaus Bielefeld Verlag, 2004 
 Cotter, Holland, Marietta Franke, Richard Flood, Herald Szeemann, and Ann Wilson. Paul Thek: The wonderful world that almost was. ex. cat. Rotterdam: Witte de With Center for Contemporary Art, 1995 
 Paul Thek/Proccessions''. Text by Suzanne Delehanty. Philadelphia: Institute of Contemporary Art, 1977

References

External links 
 Paul Thek Project
 Thek at Alexander and Bonin

1933 births
1988 deaths
20th-century American painters
American male painters
AIDS-related deaths in New York (state)
American installation artists
Art Students League of New York alumni
Bisexual artists
Bisexual men
People from Brooklyn
20th-century American sculptors
20th-century American male artists
American male sculptors
American people of German descent
American people of Irish descent
American LGBT artists
LGBT people from New York (state)
Sculptors from New York (state)
Pratt Institute alumni
American contemporary painters
20th-century LGBT people